Lily Annabelle L. Travers (born 1990) is an English actress. Her films include Late Shift (2016) and Viceroy's House (2017). She joined the main cast of the ITV historical drama Victoria (2019) for its third series. In 2017, Travers played Polly in the Doctor Who special "Twice Upon a Time".

Early and personal life
Travers was born in South London. She is the daughter of Will Travers of the Born Free Foundation, and granddaughter of actors Virginia McKenna and Bill Travers. Her mother Carrie is a teacher, and she has a younger brother. Travers discovered acting through school plays. She studied English at Durham University and participated in student productions while there. She lives in Fulham. She was raised vegetarian.

Filmography

Film

Television

References

External links
 

Living people
1991 births
21st-century English actresses
Actresses from London
Alumni of Durham University
English film actresses
English television actresses
People from the London Borough of Croydon